Michael Thomas Harrison (born 25 August 1978) is an English cricketer.  Harrison is a right-handed batsman who bowls right-arm medium-fast.  He was born at Cuckfield, Sussex.

Harrison represented the Sussex Cricket Board in a single List A match came against the Worcestershire Cricket Board in the 2nd round of the 2003 Cheltenham & Gloucester Trophy which was held in 2002.  In his only List A match, he scored an unbeaten 7 runs  With the ball he took a single wicket at figures of 1/41.

References

External links
Michael Harrison at Cricinfo
Michael Harrison at CricketArchive

1978 births
Living people
People from Cuckfield
English cricketers
Sussex Cricket Board cricketers